Probability and statistics are two closely related fields in mathematics, sometimes combined for academic purposes. They are covered in several articles:

 Probability
 Statistics
 Glossary of probability and statistics
 Notation in probability and statistics
 Timeline of probability and statistics